David Ash may refer to:

 David Ash (cricketer) (born 1944), English former cricketer
 David Ash (American football) (born 1992), American football quarterback
 L. David Ash (died 1991), automotive stylist at Ford Motor Company